Avraham is the surname of:

 Aviv Avraham (born 1996), Israeli footballer
 Ronen Avraham, American law professor
 Ruhama Avraham (born 1964), Israeli politician, former Minister of Tourism and Minister without Portfolio
 Sarah Avraham (born 1993/94), Indian-born Israeli kickboxing world champion

See also
 Abraham (surname)

Jewish surnames